Count Guido Monzino (2 March 1928 – 11 October 1988) was a twentieth-century Italian mountain climber and explorer. In 1973, he led the first Italian expedition to climb Mount Everest. He was the son of Franco Monzino, who founded the Italian supermarket chain Standa.

Life
Monzino was born on 2 March 1928 in Milan. In his early twenties, he climbed the Matterhorn. Subsequently, he made a total of 21 expeditions to places including Patagonia, Equatorial Africa, Greenland, the North Pole and the Himalaya, and sometimes following in the footsteps of the famous explorer and mountaineer Luigi Amedeo, Duke of the Abruzzi (1873–1933).

Monzino died on 11 October 1988. He was interred at the Villa del Balbianello on the banks of Lake Como, which he bought in 1974 from the heirs of Butler Ames. Monzino willed Villa del Balbianello to the Fondo per l'Ambiente Italiano.

The villa today contains a museum devoted to Monzino, which includes artifacts acquired on his expeditions including Inuit sculpture, as well as memorabilia including one of the dog sleds from his 1971 expedition to the North Pole, and Monzino's extensive collections of maps and books.

Expeditions
 1955 West Africa – Senegal, Guinea and Côte d'Ivoire
 1956 Western Alps in Italy and Switzerland – Grandes Murailles
 1957–1958 Patagonian Andes – Torres del Paine, including the first ascent of the North Tower of Paine
 1959 Karakoram mountain range, Pakistan – including the first ascent of Kanjut Sar I
 1959–1960 Equatorial Africa – Kilimanjaro
 1960 Western Greenland – 66th parallel north
 1960–1961 Equatorial Africa – Mount Kenya
 1961 Western Greenland – 74th parallel north
 1961–1962 Equatorial Africa – Mountains of the Moon and Ruwenzori
 1962 Western Greenland – 72nd parallel north by sled
 1962 Western Greenland – 77th parallel north
 1963 Eastern Greenland – Stauning Alps
 1963–1964 Saharan Africa – Tibesti
 1968 Western Greenland – a nautical expedition
 1969 Western Greenland – Ilulissat to Qaanaaq by sled
 1969 71st Italian expedition to the North Pole
 1970 Qaanaaq to Cape Columbia
 1970 Western Greenland, a nautical expedition
 1971 Cape Columbia to the North Pole by sled
 1973 Himalaya, Nepal – leader of the first Italian expedition to ascend Everest

References

Italian mountain climbers
Sportspeople from Milan
1928 births
1988 deaths
Deaths from lung cancer in Italy